Helmut Schulte (born 14 September 1957) is a German football coach and manager.

Coaching career
His best result as a coach in Bundesliga is 10th place in 1989 and 1993.

Notes

1957 births
Living people
German football managers
FC St. Pauli managers
Dynamo Dresden managers
FC Schalke 04 managers